A Seksjonsnummer or Unit number is part of a unit in the Norwegian land registry. The abbreviation is Snr.

A Seksjon is used where a property consists of several independent owner units to be sold and mortgaged separately, and where it is not normal to share the property in the usual way of sharing a business. Typically, several condominiums are in a building or several businesses are in a shopping center.  A seksjon can be of two types: a residential seksjon or a commercial seksjon.

There are several requirements that must be met for a seksjon:

All main seksjons should be part of a building, but they may have specific extras amenities the building.
All sections shall have access from the common area.
All area that serves common use shall be common area .
All residential sections should have their own bathroom, kitchen, bedroom and living room.
The entire property must be seksjoned, not just parts of it.
A request for seksjoning must be sent to the municipality. If the conditions for sectioning are met, the municipality shall grant permission for seksjoning.

A common way of writing the term for a section unit is e.g. 17/235, Snr.2, where 17 is the Gårdsnummer, 235 is the Bruksnummer and Snr.2 is the seksjonsnummer. Another way of writing is Gnr 17, Bnr 235, Snr 2.

Land Register Hierarchy
 - Fylkesnummer 
 - Kommunenummer 
Gnr. – Gårdsnummer
Bnr. – Bruksnummer
Fnr. – Festenummer
Snr. – Seksjonsnummer

References

External links
 Lov om eierseksjoner
 Seksjoneringsskjema

Nordic law
Scandinavian law
Law of Norway
Legal history of Norway